Stigmella mandingella is a moth of the family Nepticulidae. It was described by Gustafsson in 1972. It is found in Gambia.

References

Nepticulidae
Moths described in 1972
Endemic fauna of the Gambia
Moths of Africa